General Sir John Chaddesley Westall,  (	2 July 1901 – 30 September 1986) was a New Zealand Royal Marines officer who served as Commandant General Royal Marines from 1952 to 1955.

Military career
Born in Napier, New Zealand, Westall joined the Royal Marines in 1919. He served in the Second World War as a Staff Officer in intelligence activities in Singapore and Malaya from 1939 and as a Staff Officer in intelligence activities in India and Burma from 1942, before becoming a Staff Officer at the Director of Naval Intelligence Department in the Admiralty in 1944. After the war he became commander of the Infantry Training Centre, Royal Marines and then a Staff Officer in intelligence activities in Cape Town from 1947. He was appointed Chief Staff Officer at Plymouth in 1948, commander of the Royal Marine Barracks at Plymouth in 1949 and commander of the Royal Marine Barracks at Deal in 1950. He went on to be chief of staff to the Commandant General Royal Marines in 1951, and Commandant General Royal Marines in 1952 before retiring in 1955.

References

1901 births
1986 deaths
People from Napier, New Zealand
Royal Marines generals
Royal Marines personnel of World War II
Commanders of the Order of the British Empire
New Zealand Knights Commander of the Order of the Bath